Ernest Richard Barnes (January 4, 1906 - August 21, 1985) was an American politician who served in the California State Assembly for the 78th district from 1963 to 1973.  During  World War II, Barnes served in the United States Navy.

References

United States Navy personnel of World War II
1906 births
1985 deaths
20th-century American politicians
Republican Party members of the California State Assembly